Beijingese or Bejingnese may refer to:

A person from or the culture of Beijing
The Beijing dialect 
Beijing Mandarin (division of Mandarin), a variety of Mandarin spoken in and around Beijing

See also

Pekingese

Pekin (disambiguation)
Peking (disambiguation)
Beijing (disambiguation)